Barbara E. Ward (1919–1983) was a British social anthropologist and academic, who specialised in Chinese society.

Life
Ward was born in 1919. She studied history at Newnham College, an all-women's college of the University of Cambridge. She then attended the University of London, where she gained a diploma in education (a teaching qualification) in 1942. For the next five years she taught in England and West Africa. While teaching in Ghana, she became interested in social anthropology. In 1949, she completed a Master's degree from the London School of Economics having studied the Ewe speaking people of Ghana.

In 1950, Ward moved to Hong Kong. She taught sociology at Chinese University of Hong Kong, rising to the rank of reader. She spent three years studying the anthropology of the Kau Sai people. She returned many times to China and wrote about the New Territories area.

During her academic career, she lectured at the University of London, Cornell University, the University of Cambridge, and the Chinese University of Hong Kong.

At the end of her life she was preparing a book on the boat people of Hong Kong.

Selected works

References

1919 births
1983 deaths
British anthropologists
British women anthropologists
Social anthropologists
Academics of the University of London
Cornell University faculty
Academics of the University of Cambridge
Academic staff of the Chinese University of Hong Kong
Alumni of Newnham College, Cambridge
Place of birth missing
20th-century anthropologists